Mount Hebron Cemetery and Gatehouse is a historic cemetery and gatehouse located at Winchester, Virginia.  The cemetery was established in 1844 on two older churchyards, including that of Christ Episcopal Church in 1853. Many Civil War soldiers who died in Winchester's hospitals were interred in this cemetery, but after the war, the Union Burial Corps reinterred many Union dead into the Winchester National Cemetery established nearby, or to their home towns. The 1866 expansion included Stonewall Confederate Cemetery for 2,576 Confederate war dead. Iron fence added in 1891 and the Chateauesque style limestone gatehouse for superintendent added in 1902.

Founding Father Daniel Roberdeau (1727–1795) and Revolutionary War hero Daniel Morgan (1736–1802) are buried at Mount Hebron. It was added to the National Register of Historic Places in 2009.

References

External links

 

Cemeteries on the National Register of Historic Places in Virginia
1844 establishments in Virginia
Buildings and structures in Winchester, Virginia
National Register of Historic Places in Winchester, Virginia
Tourist attractions in Winchester, Virginia